New Zealand political leader Mike Moore assembled a shadow cabinet system amongst the Labour caucus following his change of position to Leader of the Opposition in 1990. He composed this of individuals who acted for the party as spokespeople in assigned roles while he was leader (1990–93).

As the Labour Party formed the largest party not in government, the frontbench team was as a result the Official Opposition of the New Zealand House of Representatives.

List of shadow ministers

Frontbench teams
When Labour held their first post-election caucus the results of several seats were still subject to recounts thusly portfolios were not allocated until the membership of the caucus was confirmed. The meeting elected Jonathan Hunt and Elizabeth Tennet as whips and Jack Elder as caucus secretary.

The list below contains a list of Moore's spokespeople and their respective roles:

First iteration
Moore announced his first lineup on 27 November 1990.

Second iteration
Moore announced a major reshuffle in December 1991.

Third iteration
Moore announced a minor reshuffle of his shadow cabinet in January 1993 to accommodate Chris Laidlaw, after he won the Wellington Central by-election, replacing Fran Wilde who resigned from Parliament after she was elected Mayor of Wellington.

Notes

References

New Zealand Labour Party
Moore, Mike
1990 establishments in New Zealand
1993 disestablishments in New Zealand